David Harold McCormick (born August 17, 1965) is an American politician and businessman. McCormick served as the CEO of Bridgewater Associates, one of the world's largest hedge funds, from 2020 to 2022.

A member of the Republican Party, he was formerly Under Secretary of the Treasury for International Affairs during the George W. Bush administration. In January 2022, McCormick announced that he was running for the U.S. Senate seat held by retiring Senator Pat Toomey. He lost to Mehmet Oz in the Republican primary by fewer than 1,000 votes.

Early life and education
McCormick was born in Washington, Pennsylvania, and raised in the Pittsburgh area. He attended high school in Bloomsburg. His father, James McCormick, was president of Bloomsburg University and chancellor for the Pennsylvania State System of Higher Education.

McCormick graduated from West Point in 1987 with a Bachelor of Science degree in mechanical engineering. He was a four-time letterman on the Army wrestling team and the team's co-captain his senior year. He was two-time Eastern runner-up at 167 pounds.

In 1996, he earned a PhD in international relations from Princeton University's School of Public and International Affairs. Two years later, he published a book based on his doctoral thesis called The Downsized Warrior about the downsizing of the U.S. Army at the end of the Cold War.

In 2021, McCormick received an honorary degree from Dickinson College.

Military career
After his graduation from West Point, McCormick went to United States Army Airborne School and to Ranger School; he was named the Honor Graduate of Ranger School. He joined the 82nd Airborne Division at Fort Bragg, North Carolina, in 1987.

McCormick was part of the first wave of U.S. troops sent into Iraq during the Gulf War in 1991. He was executive officer of a combat engineering company of 130 soldiers tasked with clearing minefields and destroying enemy munitions. McCormick left the service in 1992 after five years' commissioned service.

Private sector

From 1996 to 1999, McCormick worked as a consultant at McKinsey & Co. based in Pittsburgh.

In 1999, McCormick joined FreeMarkets, a global provider of software and services. Later that same year the company conducted an initial public offering. McCormick was promoted to president of FreeMarkets in 2001 and was named chief executive officer in 2002. He successfully sold FreeMarkets to Ariba in 2004 for approximately $500 million and then remained at Ariba as president for the next 18 months before he was asked to join the Bush administration.

Bridgewater Associates
McCormick joined Bridgewater Associates in 2009 as their president. He became co-CEO in 2017, where he was responsible for overseeing the management of the firm, and liaison with institutional investors.

In December 2019, it was announced that McCormick would become the sole CEO of Bridgewater in 2020, marking the end of a 10-year management transition of the firm. As head of Bridgewater, McCormick had raised 8 billion yuan ($1.3 billion) for a private fund in China by November 2021. In late 2021, while McCormick was mulling a run for a United States Senate seat in Pennsylvania, he began to distance himself from Bridgewater founder Ray Dalio and his defenses of China's human rights policies, openly rebuking him during company calls.

He left Bridgewater on January 3, 2022, and was replaced by Mark Bertolini and Nir Bar Dea as co-CEOS.

Political career

Bush administration
McCormick's career in government began in 2005 when he was nominated and confirmed as the Commerce Department's Under Secretary of Commerce for Industry and Security. In this role, he oversaw export controls and was part of negotiations that led to the India–United States Civil Nuclear Agreement. Later he became the Deputy National Security Advisor for International Economic Policy and was George W. Bush's personal representative and negotiator to the Group of 8 (G8) industrialized countries before moving to the Treasury Department in 2007.

McCormick was Under Secretary of the Treasury for International Affairs from 2007 to 2009, serving as the United States's leading international economic diplomat. In this role, he was the principal adviser to Treasury Secretary Henry Paulson on international economic issues and oversaw policies in the areas of international finance, trade in financial services, investment, economic development and international debt policy.

McCormick coordinated financial market policy with the Group of Seven (G7) industrialized countries and the Group of Twenty (G20) global economies, working with finance ministers as well as their deputies. He served as Secretary Paulson's point person on the international response to the 2008 financial crisis. McCormick was credited with using his relationships with top executives and policy makers around the world to help coordinate the Treasury Department's response.

Consideration for roles in the Trump administration

When Donald Trump was president-elect, he considered naming McCormick the U.S. Secretary of Treasury, but instead offered him the position of U.S. Deputy Secretary of Defense. However, he declined this position because he was happy with his role at Bridgewater. In early 2019, McCormick was under consideration for U.S. Secretary of Defense by the Trump administration.

In 2017, McCormick was named by James Mattis as a member of the Defense Policy Board Advisory Committee, a federal advisory committee to the U.S. Department of Defense. He was removed from this position by President Donald Trump in 2020 along with 11 other members with ties to the foreign policy establishment.

Political donations and endorsements

Spanning back to 2009, McCormick has donated more than $300,000 to politicians, political parties and political action committees. Politicians that McCormick has donated to include Senators John McCain and Mitch McConnell and the Congressional campaign of Mike Pompeo. In 2014, McCormick gave a $25,000 donation to the Republican Governors Association. McCormick was a supporter of the 2016 presidential campaign of Jeb Bush and donated to Bush's campaign and a PAC supporting him.

McCormick did not donate to Donald Trump's 2016 or 2020 presidential campaigns.

McCormick has mainly supported Republicans, but has donated to Democrats including Dan Helmer and Amy McGrath, both Congressional candidates, and Senator Jack Reed.

2022 U.S. Senate campaign
It was reported in December 2021 that McCormick was being recruited by Republicans to run for the open Senate seat in Pennsylvania that was held by retiring Senator Pat Toomey. This came as a result of former frontrunner Sean Parnell, who was endorsed by former President Donald Trump, withdrawing from the race amidst accusations of domestic violence from his ex-wife. McCormick announced his candidacy for the Senate on January 13, 2022.

He was criticized by his Republican primary opponents for recently being a resident of Connecticut and for leading a hedge fund that invested in China. A Super PAC supporting Republican candidate Mehmet Oz accused McCormick of outsourcing jobs from Pittsburgh to India while McCormick was CEO of FreeMarkets. McCormick denied the claim, but said he did have to eliminate 40 to 50 Pittsburgh-based jobs, denying they were related to outsourcing. In response to Oz, McCormick demanded Oz renounce his dual citizenship with Turkey.

In February 2022, McCormick ran a 30-second commercial during Super Bowl LVI highlighting the rising inflation rate and the withdrawal of troops from Afghanistan against the audio background of crowds chanting "Let's go Brandon," which is euphemistic code for "Fuck Joe Biden."

McCormick lost to Oz in the primary election, garnering 31.1 percent of the vote compared to Oz's 31.2 percent. An automatic recount was triggered due to the voting margin being less than 0.5 percent. The recount ultimately failed to help McCormick whose campaign launched a court case to have undated mail-in ballots counted with the rest of the votes. The mail-in ballots were seen as potentially helping McCormick should they be included. However McCormick later conceded the race to Oz and dropped the court case.  He lost to Oz by a margin of less than 1,000 votes.

During the primary, McCormick released campaign televised advertisements questioning Oz's stances on conservative issues such as abortion and gun rights, referring to Oz as a "Hollywood liberal" and a "RINO" (Republican In Name Only). Those ads continued to hurt Oz into the general election against Democrat John Fetterman, according to Politico.

Political positions

2021 U.S. Capitol attack
McCormick expressed regret over the 2021 attack at the U. 
S. Capitol. He said the attack marks "a dark chapter in American history" and "puts a highlight on the responsibility of leaders to be able to create a dialogue where people are understood." He also said "I think [Trump] has some responsibility, a lot of responsibility for [the attack], and I think that this last dark chapter at the Capitol...history will look very unfavorably on that and all the people that were involved in that.

China
In 2007, McCormick spoke as a member of the Bush administration in Beijing, China, where he said that "When China succeeds, the United States succeeds..." and that the United States owes "much of the strength and vitality of our economic relationship today to the remarkable success of China's economic development over the last three decades..." As a member of the Bush administration, McCormick pushed China to raise the value of its currency. He later praised President Trump's administration for measures to counter China.

Free trade
McCormick has highlighted the benefits of free trade stating in 2008 that "the key to remaining competitive in today’s changing world is embracing openness to trade and to investment and to people". In more recent times, he has supported President Trump's America First policy, indicating a shift. In the past, he has seemed to argue that the benefits of free trade outweighed the downside of displacing American workers and suggested retraining those who whose jobs have become obsolete. He also opposed U.S. exports which gave advantages to China's military. in the past, McCormick supported the Trans-Pacific Partnership.

American foreign policy
McCormick has championed the role of a strong United States on the world stage and has advocated for the idea that the United States can focus on addressing domestic issues while also leading efforts to promote human rights. In 2016 he stated, "If we are to promote equality and pluralism around the world, we must walk towards, rather than away from, our unique success in advancing these values at home while still embracing the idea that America is, and always will be, a work in progress".

Immigration
McCormick has called for increasing skilled immigration to the United States. He supports building a wall on the US-Mexico border.

LGBTQ rights
In 2013, McCormick joined 131 other Republicans in signing an amicus brief filed at the United States Supreme Court supporting the legalization of gay marriage prior to Obergefell v. Hodges. During McCormick's tenure as CEO of Bridgewater Associates, the company's policy was to fully pay for gender transition surgery. During his campaign for Senate, McCormick stated that he opposes federal funding towards gender transition surgeries and transgender girls participating in girls competitive sports.

Personal life
In 2019, McCormick married Dina Powell, an executive at Goldman Sachs who was Deputy National Security Advisor in the Trump Administration. He was previously married to Amy Richardson, with whom he has four children. McCormick and Powell previously resided in Connecticut and moved to Pennsylvania in 2022.

Trusteeship and philanthropy
McCormick is a trustee of the Aspen Institute and he is the chairman of the International Advisory Board of the Atlantic Council. He is a member of the Aspen Strategy Group and the Defense Policy Board. In 2009, McCormick was also appointed a faculty member at Carnegie Mellon's Heinz College and named a Distinguished Service Professor of Information Technology, Public Policy and Management. McCormick is on the board of both the United Service Organizations (USO) and the Hospital for Special Surgery (HSS).

Published works
 The Downsized Warrior: America's Army in Transition (1998)

References

External links

 
 Dave McCormick at Politifact

|-

|-

1965 births
20th-century American businesspeople
21st-century American businesspeople
American financial businesspeople
American hedge fund managers
Businesspeople from Connecticut
Businesspeople from Pittsburgh
Candidates in the 2022 United States Senate elections
Carnegie Mellon University faculty
Carnegie Mellon University trustees
Connecticut Republicans
George W. Bush administration personnel
Henry Crown Fellows
Living people
McKinsey & Company people
Military personnel from Pennsylvania
Pennsylvania Democrats
Pennsylvania Republicans
Princeton School of Public and International Affairs alumni
United States Army officers
United States Army personnel of the Gulf War
United States Military Academy alumni